Welcome Break is a British motorway service station operator that operates 35 motorway service stations in the UK. It is the second-largest motorway service area operator behind Moto. It also operates hotels and motels. It is a subsidiary of Applegreen.

History

Opened in 1959, the service area at Newport Pagnell on the M1 motorway near Milton Keynes by Motorway Services Ltd was the company's first service area under the Forte name and was the second service area to be constructed on the fledgling UK motorway network, however it was still the first to open. The name "Welcome Break" came from a chain of rival restaurants to Little Chef, created by Allen Jones. These restaurants eventually either became Happy Eaters or closed. The name was brought back when Hanson Trust renamed Ross Food's service stations. The company's portfolio was expanded to five motorway service areas during periods under the ownership of the Imperial Group and subsequently the Hanson Trust before being purchased by Trusthouse Forte in 1986. Under this deal, the Welcome Break name was adopted across the entire estate, with Trusthouse Forte's sixteen existing service areas re-branded.

Split from Trusthouse Forte
In January 1996, the Forte Group was the subject of a £3.9 billion hostile takeover by the British media group Granada. Due to Granada's existing major presence in the motorway services market, a subsequent investigation by the Monopolies and Mergers Commission ordered Granada to sell 27 of the Welcome Break sites. The company was eventually bought by Investcorp in 1997 for £476M. Investcorp then sold Welcome Break to Appia Investments in March 2008 for £500M.

Applegreen ownership
In August 2018 Applegreen agreed to purchase the majority of Welcome Break for €361.8M.

Facilities 

The facilities available at Welcome Break service areas varies at each site, with most sites open 24 hours a day throughout the year. Typically, each service area comprises a café or restaurant, a retail outlet, a hotel and a petrol station. Some sites have WHSmith, Burger King, an eat-in restaurant, a coffee shop (Starbucks Coffee), and a petrol station (Shell or BP).

Hotels 
The majority of hotels at Welcome Break service areas are franchises of Days Inn or Ramada; many of these were once branded under Welcome Break's own brand, "Welcome Lodge"; the last of these, at Newport Pagnell and Charnock Richard, were rebranded to Days Inns in May 2009 and also took over operation of three former PURPLE hotels at Cambridge, Peterborough, and Stevenage in July 2009, each three have reopened as Days Inn taking its total to 26. In September 2012, Welcome Break opened a Days Inn at the new Cobham Service area on the M25, and 2013 saw a rebrand of Days Hotel London North and Days Inn London Stansted into Ramada hotels. In December 2014, Welcome Break purchased Days Hotel Wakefield, and after a full refurbishment it was reopened as Ramada Wakefield in January 2015.

Catering 

When Welcome Break chain was sold by Granada, branches of Little Chef at those sites were replaced a similar table service restaurant, Red Hen. High prices earned the chain the nickname "Little Thief".

Eat In became Welcome Break's own brand self-service restaurant. However, these have since been replaced with food courts, featuring a selection of brands varying from location to location:
 Subway was opened at 15 Welcome Break sites from January 2015 to May 2015.
 Harry Ramsden's, a UK-based fish and chip restaurant (also offering a range of breakfast to eat in or take away), is included at the majority of sites.
 Waitrose has franchise stores at most Welcome Breaks.
 In May 2006, a branch of the international coffeehouse chain Starbucks was opened on a trial basis at Corley services on the M6 motorway. Starbucks is now available in most Welcome Break services. Some services have drive-through Starbucks in separate buildings.
 Welcome Break is a long-standing KFC licensee, operating KFC fast food restaurants at 24 of its service areas. In May 2005, Welcome Break announced a deal with KFC designed to bypass tough UK motorway signage legislation. UK law used to prevents motorway service area operators from displaying additional brand names other than their own company name on roadside signage. To circumvent this restriction, a new subsidiary company "Welcome Break KFC" was registered. However now it is legal to have up to 6 logos on motorway service station signs.
 Burger King restaurants operate at all Welcome Break service stations except Burtonwood and Derby South.
 Tossed is a healthy food based restaurant chain at selected Welcome Break services. These are Oxford, South Mimms, Birchanger Green, Warwick and Fleet.
 In 1995, it was announced that they were going to add a McDonald's to every one of the services, but the process was stopped after just two because Forte were acquired by Granada (now Moto), a deal which included Welcome Break and lost out to Burger King being added instead. There are no longer any McDonald's branches at Welcome Break sites with the last two at Fleet services and Woodall services closing in March 2020. This was due to a licensing agreement with Burger King that prevents a McDonald's on any site with a Burger King.
 Chopstix, first introduced in August 2016 at Birchanger Green and now has a few branches at other services.

WHSmith
Recently, Welcome Break service areas have followed the industry-wide trend towards partnership with High Street brands. W H Smith stores have been introduced at the majority of Welcome Break sites as a replacement for the traditional unbranded retail outlets. Initially launched as a trial store at the Newport Pagnell site in February 2007, W H Smith stores have now been rolled out across the Welcome Break portfolio.

Fone Bitz
Fone Bitz sell electronics across the motorway network and operate at most Welcome Break sites. Fone Bitz sell a range of Mobile Phone, iPad, iPod, Laptop, electronic and car accessories in general.

Welcome Break Gaming
Welcome Break Gaming is a self branded betting arcade located at all Welcome Break sites, except the Welcome Break operated Days Inn hotels and motels.

Gridserve (previously Ecotricity)
In July 2011 it was announced that the green energy provider Ecotricity will be providing fast and normal electric vehicle charging stations at Welcome Break service stations as part of its 'Electric highway' network, linking London in the south with Exeter in the west and Edinburgh in the north.

In July 2021, it was announced that Gridserve had purchased Ecotricity's "Electric Highway" charging network. Gridserve agreed to maintain the network's relationship with Welcome Break, and will start updating charge points to include contactless payment and faster chargers

However, whilst other MSAs were rapidly upgraded, by Christmas of 2021 Gridserve had been unable to upgrade any of the Welcome Break sites. Speculation online that Welcome Break were blocking them from doing so was given credence by the installation at South Mimms of EV chargers bearing the Welcome Break brand.

Logo

Welcome Break introduced a new company logo in September 2006. The swan, integral to the previous company logo, has been removed. The new logo features a black background with the words 'welcome' and 'break' in green and white respectively. Each site now also has a large mural depicting a local landmark unique to that site. Many of these were commissioned from artist David Fisher.

Locations

 Abington – M74 J13
 Birchanger – M11 J8
 Burtonwood – M62 J8
 Cardiff Gate – M4 J30
 Charnock Richard – M6 between J27 and J28
 Corley – M6 between J3 and J4
 Derby South – A50 between J1 and J2
 Fleet – M3 between J4a and J5
 Gordano – M5 J19
 Gretna Green – A74(M) between J21 and J22
 Hartshead Moor – M62 between J25 and J26
 Hopwood Park – M42 J2
 Keele – M6 between J15 and J16
 Leicester Forest East – M1 between J21 and J21a
 London Gateway – M1 between J2 and J4
 Membury – M4 between J14 and J15
 Michaelwood – M5 between J13 and J14
 Newport Pagnell – M1 – between J14 and J15
 Oxford – M40 J8a
 Peartree – A34 junction with A44
 Sarn Park – M4 J36
 Sedgemoor (Northbound) – M5 between J21 and J22
 South Mimms – M25 J23, A1(M) J1
 Telford – M54 J4
 Warwick – M40 between J12 and J13
 Woodall – M1 between J30 and J31

See also
 RoadChef
 Moto
 Extra
 Motorway service station

References

Further reading
 Times article March 2008

External links

 Welcome Break
 Motorway Services Online – Welcome Break

Catering and food service companies of the United Kingdom
British companies established in 1959
Retail companies established in 1959
Food and drink companies established in 1959
Hospitality companies established in 1959
1986 mergers and acquisitions
1997 mergers and acquisitions
2008 mergers and acquisitions
2018 mergers and acquisitions
Companies based in Milton Keynes
1959 establishments in England